John Parsons Shillingford  (1914–1999) was a British physician and cardiologist, known as a pioneer of the introduction of coronary care units in the UK in the 1960s.

Biography
After education at Bishop's Stortford College, John Parsons Shillingford studied at the London Hospital Medical School. At the beginning of WWII he won a Rockefeller Foundation scholarship to Harvard Medical School and graduated there MD (Harvard) in 1943. He held medical residency appointments at Baltimore's Johns Hopkins Hospital and at Manhattan's Presbyterian Hospital. He qualified MRCS, LRCP in 1945. He graduated MB BS (London) in 1945 and MD (London) in 1948. After WWII, he worked at the London Hospital until 1950. In 1950 John McMichael, who was forming research teams, recruited Shillingford to the Royal Postgraduate Medical School in Hammersmith. Shillingford's research team studied the narrowing of the arteries that occurs with ageing. He promoted engineering and biophysics in cardiovascular research.

In 1947 in Brentford, Middlesex, he married Doris Margaret ('Jill') Franklin (1917–1992). Upon his death in 1999 he was survived by two sons and a daughter.

Awards and honours
 1960 — Fellow of the Royal College of Physicians
 1966 — Fellow of the American College of Cardiology
 1968 – President of the Section of Experimental Medicine, Annual Meeting of the Royal Society of Medicine
 1972 — Lumleian Lecturer on Management of Acute Myocardial Infarction over the Last Ten Years
 1974 – Honorary Fellow of the American College of Physicians
 1988 — Commander of the Order of the British Empire

Selected publications

References 

1914 births
1999 deaths
20th-century English medical doctors
British cardiologists
People educated at Bishop's Stortford College
Harvard Medical School alumni
Alumni of the London Hospital Medical College
Fellows of the Royal College of Physicians
Physicians of Hammersmith Hospital
Commanders of the Order of the British Empire